The Al Faisaliyah Tower (or Al Faisaliah Tower) is a commercial skyscraper and mixed-use complex located in the al-Olaya district of Riyadh, Saudi Arabia. The 267-metre-high office tower, the centerpiece of the Foster + Partners development, it is notable for having been the first skyscraper built in Saudi Arabia, and for the monumental stained glass wall of its lobby, designed by architectural artist Brian Clarke in collaboration with Norman Foster. Presently the seventh tallest building in Saudi Arabia after the Kingdom Centre, Burj Rafal and Abraj Al Bait, the Center presently ranks as the 325th tallest building in the world.

History and structure
First appointed to the architectural practice Foster + Partners in 1994, the complex was commissioned by Prince Abdullah Al-Faisal, with construction begun in 1997. The complex is made up of the central office tower, a five-star hotel, a three-storey retail mall, and a banqueting and conference hall. The skyscraper comprises 30 floors of office space, above which, at 200 metres above ground level, an observation deck provides a panoramic view of Riyadh. The 240,000-square-metre Centre was completed in May 2000, with the skyscraper opened to the public in the same month.
The skyscraper, also called the Star Dome, contains one of Saudi Arabia's premier restaurants, "The Globe", located in the sphere above the observation deck, possessing 360 degree views of the city.

Stained glass
In 1999, the artist Brian Clarke, who had formerly collaborated with Norman Foster on architectural art proposals for Stansted and Chep Lap Kok airports, was commissioned to design a 22,000 sq. ft. wall of glass for the modular atrial space connecting the complex's hotel, north of the tower's base, and the tower's residential and retail developments. Clarke's initial designs for the project, produced in 1994 and incorporating traditionally-leaded stained glass and an interrelated glass mosaic floor for what was then known as 'The Link Building', developed in tandem with the architect's resolution of the complex, and were resolved as an integral, five-storey-high glass art 'skin', considered a landmark development in the history of stained glass.

Similar towers
 The Shard, building in London

Other towers

 Kingdom Center
 Burj Rafal
 Abraj Al Bait

References

External links

 Al-Faisaliah Center at ArchNet

|-

2000 establishments in Saudi Arabia
Commercial buildings completed in 2000
Skyscrapers in Riyadh
Buildings and structures with revolving restaurants
Residential skyscrapers in Saudi Arabia
Skyscraper office buildings in Saudi Arabia
Landmarks in Saudi Arabia